Vastag or Vaștag is a surname. Notable people with the surname include:

Andrei Vaștag (born 1994), Romanian footballer, son of Francisc Vaștag (see below)
Csaba Vastag (born 1982), Hungarian musician
Francisc Vaștag (born 1969), Romanian boxer
Tamás Vastag (born 1991), Hungarian singer

See also
Vastagh